Gekko bannaense, the Banna parachute gecko, is a species of gecko. It is endemic to China.

References 

Gekko
Reptiles described in 2016